The New Zealand men's national volleyball team represents New Zealand in international volleyball competitions and friendly matches. As of October 2019, the team is ranked 44th in the world.

References

 

V
National men's volleyball teams
Volleyball in New Zealand
Men's sport in New Zealand